Richard Liberty (born Riccardo Liberatoscioli; March 3, 1932 – October 2, 2000) was an American film and television actor. His film work included George A. Romero's The Crazies (1973), The Final Countdown, Porky's II: The Next Day, and Flight of the Navigator. Television appearances included roles on Miami Vice and Key West. He is probably best known for portraying Dr. Matthew "Frankenstein" Logan in Romero's Day of the Dead (1985).

Liberty died on October 2, 2000, in Dania, Florida, at the age of 68 from a heart attack. His final interview, conducted by film historians Christian Stavrakis and Robert Telleria, may be heard as a supplement on the Anchor Bay Entertainment DVD and Blu-ray releases of Day of the Dead.

Filmography

References

External links

YouTube: Richard Liberty

1932 births
2000 deaths
20th-century American male actors
American male film actors
American male television actors
Male actors from New York City